The John Tucker Daland House (1851–1852) is an imposing, Italianate house designed by architect Gridley James Fox Bryant and is located at 132 Essex Street, Salem, Massachusetts, United States in the Essex Institute Historic District and now owned by the Peabody Essex Museum as home for the Essex Institute. 

The three-story brick house was originally built for John Tucker Daland, a prosperous merchant. The Dalands lived in the house until 1885, when it was acquired by the Essex Institute. It was then remodeled as offices by architect William Devereux Dennis (1847–1913) and in 1907 connected to the adjacent Plummer Hall (former home to the Salem Athenaeum).

The house was among the last detached brick houses to be built in Salem. Features of interest include rusticated corner quoins and foundation, fine cornices, both arched and flat-entablatured windows, and an imposing front porch supported by Corinthian columns and topped with a Palladian window. At one time the house also featured roof and porch balustrades, as well as panelled brick chimneys.

See also
List of historic houses in Massachusetts

External links
Peabody Essex Museum: Phillips Library Neighborhood, includes John Tucker Daland House
Buildings in Salem - scroll down for photos

References 
 Bryant F. Tolles, Jr., Architecture in Salem: An Illustrated Guide, University Press of New England, Hanover and London, reissued 2004.

Houses completed in 1852
Houses in Salem, Massachusetts
Peabody Essex Museum
1852 establishments in Massachusetts